This is a list of prisons within Hebei province of the People's Republic of China.

Sources 
 

Buildings and structures in Hebei
Hebei